Collin College is a public community college district in Texas. Founded in 1985, the district has grown as the county has grown from around 5,000 students in 1986 to more than 58,000 credit and noncredit students.

Formerly known as the Collin County Community College District, CCCCD, or CCCC, the college rebranded itself "Collin College" in March 2007. The district headquarters is in the Collin Higher Education Center in McKinney.

As defined by the Texas Legislature, the official service area of Collin College includes all of Collin County and Rockwall County and the portions of Denton County within the cities of Frisco and The Colony and the portions included within the Celina and Prosper school districts.

Campuses

The McKinney Campus (also known as Central Park Campus) opened in 1985. The campus features include a multistory parking garage, library, classrooms, offices, and a student development center. The campus library totals . In January 2016, Collin College added a 125,000-square-foot state-of-the-art Health Sciences Center.

The Plano Campus (also known as Spring Creek Campus) opened in fall of 1988. By number of students, this campus is the largest and hosts the college district's fine arts and athletics programs. The campus features a  art gallery, theatre center, gymnasium (Cougar Hall), and tennis facilities. In January 2013, the college opened an 88,000-square-foot library building with majestic architecture inspired by Thomas Jefferson's design for the University of Virginia.

The Frisco Campus (also known as Preston Ridge Campus) opened in July 1995. In 2014, thanks to a $2 million gift for scholarships by Roger and Jody Lawler of Frisco, the campus renamed their  building from "D Building" to "Lawler Hall" in honor of the donation. Collin College's business and high-tech programs are centered at Frisco Campus. The culinary arts program moved there in 2009.

The district administration is located in the Collin Higher Education Center (CHEC) in McKinney. The CHEC hosts – among other things – a number of bachelor's, master's and doctoral programs from five North Texas universities: Texas A&M University-Commerce, Texas Woman's University, the University of Texas at Dallas, Texas Tech University, and the University of North Texas. Offerings vary per university. The center is located at the intersection of the Central Expressway (U.S. Route 75) and Texas State Highway 121.

The Public Safety Training Center (PSTC) in McKinney provides reality-based training for law enforcement and firefighter cadets and active first responders. Training elements include law enforcement and firefighter training areas with simulated retail spaces, office buildings, and living areas for reality-based scenario training, three firearms ranges, specialized gas-fired burn structures, a confined-space rescue simulator, and other training obstacles. The facility, which was built in partnership with the cities of McKinney and Allen, opened in August 2018.

The Technical Campus, located in Allen, opened in the fall of 2020. The campus provides workforce programs in fields including automotive, collision repair, computer-aided drafting and design, construction, electronics engineering, HVAC, welding, and more. The campus features architecture unique among Collin College facilities, including an underground garage, a cantilevered third floor, and four buildings with large laboratory spaces dedicated to individual trade areas.

The Wylie Campus also opened in the fall of 2020. Designed to support 7,500 students at capacity, the campus's opening allowed for the expansion of the college's veterinary medicine program. The campus was built in cooperation with the city of Wylie, which donated about 44 acres across the street from the city's municipal complex toward the project.

Farmersville Campus opened in March 2021. The first building, a roughly 52,000-square-foot facility, is designed to accommodate 1,250 learners.

Celina Campus opened in the fall of 2021. The first phase of the campus is 96,000 square feet and support up to 2,500 students.

Collin College also educates students at an education center in Rockwall and a continuing education center in Plano. The following is a list of the college district's current and planned campuses.

Celina Campus
Collin College Technical Campus (Allen)
Collin Higher Education Center (McKinney)
Courtyard Center (Plano)
Farmersville Campus 
Frisco Campus (Preston Ridge Campus)
McKinney Campus (Central Park Campus)
Public Safety Training Center (McKinney)
Plano Campus (Spring Creek Campus)
Rockwall Center
Wylie

2017 bond program and current master plan
The residents of Collin County approved a $600 million bond proposition in May 2017 to fund the college district's master plan. Master plan projects funded by the bond included the Technical Campus, the Wylie Campus, the Public Safety Training Center in McKinney, and safety upgrades to existing campuses. Outstanding projects funded by the bond include planned campuses in Celina and Farmersville, an information technology building at the Frisco Campus, welcome centers at the college's existing campuses, and other upgrades to improve student experiences throughout the district.

The master plan in place during the bond election was supplanted by a new master plan in 2020 that will guide the college through 2025. Priorities for the new master plan include: streamlining the college's administrative data systems to improve business processes and accommodate growth; implementing planned and future components of the comprehensive safety and emergency management plan; strategically expanding existing instruction and service delivery modalities to maximize access to college programs; examining and developing expansion plans for existing facilities and future programs to accommodate growth in the service area; completing phase III and IV projects from the previous master plan and prioritizing and repurposing available facilities; assessing current and proposed college facilities and extracurricular programs to identify and prioritize opportunities for improved student recruitment, engagement, and success.

Coronavirus deaths

Collin College has been repeatedly criticized for its lack of transparency regarding COVID-19 on campus and risks of in-person classes. College president Matkin overruled faculty concerns about virus protections in June 2020, stating the campus would remain open. In August 2020, he downplayed the virus, stating the national case count is "clearly inflated". 

During that Fall 2020 semester, a faculty member, a student and a staff member all died of COVID-19. Iris Meda, a recently retired nurse, had begun teaching nursing assistant classes in August 2020. According to her family, she came in contact with a sick student in October and died in mid-November. The staff were informed of her death as an information item 22 paragraphs deep in an email titled "College Update & Happy Thanksgiving!" A student died of COVID-19 in October 2020, and a food-service employee infection led to the closure of the cafeteria, though faculty only learned about the infections informally. The school's services went virtual after classes ended for the semester on December 14.  Services resumed in-person, in January, after the normal holiday break.

Later, in August 2021, dean of nursing Jane Leach also died from COVID-19.

Free speech controversy 
On February 17, 2021, the Foundation for Individual Rights in Education (FIRE) named Collin College to its 10th annual list of the "10 Worst Colleges for Free Speech: 2021" list. FIRE cited Collin College president Neil Matkin's public condemnation of a tweet sent by history professor Lora Burnett from her personal account that was critical of then Vice President Mike Pence. FIRE also referenced the senior administration's overturning of recommended contract renewals of two faculty members, Audra Heaslip and Suzanne Jones. Both professors had publicly criticized Collin College's handling of COVID-19, and they were members of the Collin College chapter of the Texas Faculty Association, a non-bargaining union disliked by college administration. Collin College declined to renew Lora Burnett's teaching contract for the following year and later settled a lawsuit over her non-renewal for $70,000 and attorney's fees. Jones also sued the university in September 2021 and the litigation for her case is ongoing. 

In January 2022, shortly after settling the lawsuit by Professor Burnett, Collin College fired history professor Michael Phillips following his suggestion that students in his classes consider wearing masks. Phillips had served for 13 years as a professor at the college. Earlier in the academic year, Collin College had disciplined Professor Phillips for a Twitter post that revealed the college's gag rule banning even the suggestion that students wear masks. According to Professor Phillips, in 2017, President Matkin and other members of the administration admonished him and threatened his job following his campaign to press the city of Dallas to remove its Confederate monuments. On March 8, 2022, Phillips, in conjunction with FIRE, sued the college.

Several Collin College employees have claimed that the college requires many employees to sign nondisclosure agreements, an unusual practice in higher education.

Academics
In addition to associate degrees, the college has bachelor's degrees in cybersecurity and nursing established in 2019; this was the first time Collin College made its own bachelor's degrees available. The college had worked with university partners to offer their bachelor's degrees at its Collin Higher Education Center.

Athletics
Collin College's athletic program offers scholarships in men and women's basketball and tennis. The teams are known as the Cougars and Lady Cougars, respectively. They compete in the North Texas Junior College Athletic Conference in the NJCAA Region 5. The Lady Cougars won NTJCAC conference championships in 2015, 2016, 2017, 2018, and 2020.

The competition gym and tennis facilities are located on the Plano (Spring Creek) Campus.

Crisis intervention training 

Collin College provides training for law enforcement officers in North Texas, especially in the Collin County and Dallas area.  The training is certified by the Texas Commission on Law Enforcement, and is a 40-hour class based on the Memphis training model. The training is in the classroom, with reality-based conflict resolution, with presentation by the mentally ill and professional mental health providers.

Awards
In 2020, the college applied for and was classified among "community engaged" institutions. Collin College was one of three two-year institutions in the nation and one of 119 U.S. colleges and universities to receive the classification; only 11 institutions in Texas were awarded this distinction in 2015 and 2020 combined. That same year, the college was also named a center of excellence in nursing education by the National League for Nursing. The following year, the college's respiratory care program received the Distinguished Registered Respiratory Therapist Credentialing Success Award from the Commission on Accreditation for Respiratory Care for the eighth consecutive year. The college was named one of the best higher-education employers in the nation for the second year in a row, according to a survey by The Great Colleges to Work For® program.

Notable faculty

Levi Bryant – Continental philosopher, influential figure of the Speculative Realism and Object-Oriented Ontology movements.
 Ceilidh Charleson-Jennings — Recognized in 2013 as the Texas Professor of the Year by the Carnegie Foundation for the Advancement of Teaching and the Council for Advancement and Support of Education.
 Amina El-Ashmawy — Recognized in 2015 as a U.S. Professor of the Year by the Carnegie Foundation for the Advancement of Teaching and the Council for Advancement and Support of Education.
 Rosemary Karr — Recognized as a 2007 U.S. Professor of the Year by the Carnegie Foundation for the Advancement of Teaching and the Council for Advancement and Support of Education.
 Tracey McKenzie — Recognized as a 2009 U.S. Professor of the Year by the Carnegie Foundation for the Advancement of Teaching and the Council for Advancement and Support of Education.
 Jennifer O'Loughlin-Brooks — Recognized in 2006 as the Texas Professor of the Year by the Carnegie Foundation for the Advancement of Teaching and the Council for Advancement and Support of Education.
 Greg Sherman — Recognized in 2012 as the Texas Professor of the Year by the Carnegie Foundation for the Advancement of Teaching and the Council for Advancement and Support of Education.

References

External links

 

Education in Collin County, Texas
Universities and colleges in the Dallas–Fort Worth metroplex
Universities and colleges accredited by the Southern Association of Colleges and Schools
Two-year colleges in the United States
Educational institutions established in 1985
Community colleges in Texas
Education in Rockwall County, Texas
Education in Denton County, Texas
Buildings and structures in Collin County, Texas
McKinney, Texas
Plano, Texas
Richardson, Texas
NJCAA athletics
1985 establishments in Texas